WGDL (1200 AM and translator W227DR 93.3 FM, "Radio Grito") is a radio station broadcasting a Spanish Variety format. Licensed to Lares, Puerto Rico, it serves the Puerto Rico area.  The station is owned by Lares Broadcasting Corporation.

History

WGDL signed on September 23, 1986. It began operating at night in 1991 under a long-term special temporary authority, made possible by the move of HIBS "Radio Dial" in San Pedro de Macorís, Dominican Republic, to 670 kHz. The station's news programming comes from Red Informativa de Puerto Rico and sister station Red 93.7 FM. The station rebroadcasts all of its programming on 93.3 FM.

In this radio station create a religious, cultural and political interest programs for our listeners enjoy and have their favorites are made. For years we have been the official broadcaster of the Festival Nacional del Guineo, Patriotas de Lares (Superior Volleyball League), Fiestas de Pueblo and other activities. We have the ability to reach across the central area of the island, all these people together make up about some 500,000 people.

Translator stations

External links

Radio stations established in 1986
GDL
Lares, Puerto Rico
1986 establishments in Puerto Rico
GDL